The 1913 Baylor football team was an American football team that represented Baylor University as an independent during the 1913 college football season. In its first season under head coach Norman C. Paine, the team compiled a 4–4–2 record and was outscored by a total of 208 to 67.

Schedule

References

Baylor
Baylor Bears football seasons
Baylor Bears football